The Easy Road is a 1921 American silent drama film directed by Tom Forman and written by Beulah Marie Dix. The film is based upon a story by Blair Hall. The Easy Road stars Thomas Meighan, Gladys George, Grace Goodall, Arthur Edmund Carewe, Lila Lee, Laura Anson, and Viora Daniel. The film was released on February 13, 1921, by Paramount Pictures.

Cast 
Thomas Meighan as Leonard Fayne
Gladys George as Isabel Grace
Grace Goodall as Katherine Dare
Arthur Edmund Carewe as Heminway 
Lila Lee as Ella Klotz
Laura Anson as Minnie Baldwin
Viora Daniel as Laura

Production
Filming began in September 1920, at the Lasky studio under the title Easy Street.

Preservation Status
The film is presumed lost.

References

External links 

 
 

1921 films
1921 drama films
Silent American drama films
American silent feature films
American black-and-white films
Famous Players-Lasky films
Films directed by Tom Forman
Paramount Pictures films
Lost American films
1921 lost films
Lost drama films
1920s American films